William Alexander Gambling FRS, FREng (11 October 1926–9 January 2021) was a British electrical engineer.

Life
From 1950 to 1955, he was lecturer in electric power engineering at the University of Liverpool.
He taught at the University of Southampton and was dean of Engineering and Applied Sciences from 1972 to 1975.

He was president of Institution of Electronic and Radio Engineers in 1978. In 1979, he was elected a Fellow of the Royal Academy of Engineering

He was BT professor of optical communications from 1980 to 1995 and founder and director of the Optoelectronics Research Centre from 1989 to 1995.

He was Royal Society Kan Tong Po visiting professor at the University of Hong Kong from 1996 to 2001.  He was director of Research and Development at Optoelectronics LTK Industries Ltd from 2002 to 2007.

He was awarded the James Alfred Ewing Medal in 2002. He died in Spain on 9 January 2021.

Works
Electronics in transition, University of Southampton, 1968
Photons and fibres: the new world of communications, Royal Academy of Engineering, 1992
S. T. Lee, P. S. Chung, William Alexander Gambling, C. S. Lee, Papers presented at the Asia-Pacific Symposium on Organic Electrolumuniscent Materials and Devices, City University of Hong Kong, 2000

References

External links
http://www.patentbuddy.com/Inventor/Gambling-William-Alexander/3683321

1926 births
2021 deaths
British electrical engineers
Fellows of the Royal Society